This is a list of Casefile episodes. Casefile is a weekly (sometimes fortnightly) Australian crime podcast that first aired in January 2016 and hosted by an Australian man who wishes to remain anonymous. The series deals with solved or cold criminal cases, often related to well-known murders and serial crimes. This list also includes the series' companion podcast, From the Files, aired since July 2019 but placed on hiatus in 2020.

Episodes 
The release dates listed below are based on the official website. Not all cases are still available however:

 Case 19 (Snowtown, released 14 May 2016) is currently unavailable. The website states that “This episode was released in the early days of Casefile. Since then, we have been made aware that incorrect terminology was used in the script. Out of respect for the LGBTQIA community, we have decided to remove the episode, with a view to rewriting and re-releasing it in the future.”
 Case 30 (The Claremont Serial Killer, released 20 August 2016) is also currently unavailable. The website states that "This episode of Casefile was released in 2016 when the case was still unresolved. Major developments have since occurred and as a result, we have elected to remove the episode, with a view to releasing an updated version in the future."
 Case 55 (Simone Strobel, released 15 July 2017), was removed due to legal issues, although general details of the podcast itself are still publicly available.

2016

2017

2018

2019

2020

2021

2022

2023

From the Files
In July 2019, it was announced that a new "informal companion" series, From the Files, would be aired monthly in the show's off week. However, it was announced in December 2019 that From the Files would be put on hiatus for 2020.

2019

2020

References

External links 
 
From the Files website

Australian crime-related lists
Lists of podcast episodes